Leopoldo Metlicovitz (Trieste, 17 July 1868 - Ponte Lambro, 19 October 1944) was an Italian painter, illustrator and poster designer.

Together with Leonetto Cappiello, Adolf Hohenstein, Giovanni Maria Mataloni and Marcello Dudovich, he is considered one of the fathers of modern Italian poster art.

Biography 

Son of a merchant of Dalmatian origins (the family name was originally Metlicovich), he began working in the family business at a very young age and at fourteen years old he entered as an apprentice in a printing house in Udine, where he learned the technique of lithography. Here he is noticed by Giulio Ricordi, owner of the homonymous musical house and of the Officine Grafiche, who invites him to move to Milan to complete his training.

From 1888 to 1892 he collaborated with Tensi, a photographic products company, and in 1892 he joined Ricordi as technical director. At first he practiced transposing the works of other famous poster artists such as Hohenstein and Mataloni onto lithographic stone, then his pictorial talent was increasingly appreciated and he began creating posters and illustrations for Ricordi's music editions. Many of the works of the most famous composers of the time are advertised on posters signed by Metlicovitz: from those of Giacomo Puccini such as Tosca (1900), Madama Butterfly (1904) and Turandot (1926) to Iris by Pietro Mascagni (1898), to Conchita by Riccardo Zandonai (1911).
At the end of the nineteenth century, the Grandi Magazzini Mele of Naples entrusted Officine Ricordi with their own advertising campaign for their clothing, one of the first on a large scale, and the artifices of success were the posters created by Metlicovitz together with Aleardo Terzi, Dudovich, Cappiello and others.

In 1906, on the occasion of the great Universal Exhibition in Milan, Metlicovitz won the competition for the poster that symbolized the fair, dedicated to the Simplon Tunnel, making a name for himself as a poster designer. There are dozens of magazine covers, scores and opera librettos published by Ricordi, which bear his signature including the magazines Music and Musicians (1902-1905) and Ars et Labor (1906-1912), his work as an illustrator also appear on La Lettura (1906-1907, 1909) monthly Corriere della Sera.

Especially from the beginning of the twentieth century, the Officine Grafiche Ricordi began to sell various products that were the fruit of a merchandising ante-litteram, thanks to the entrepreneurial spirit of Giulio Ricordi, and many of them bore the signature of Leopoldo Metlicovitz, such as the Almanacco Verdiano of 1902 or the series of illustrated postcards on musical themes, such as those for the operas La Bohème, Tosca, Madama Butterfly or Germania by Alberto Franchetti.

Between 1907 and 1910 Metlicovitz, on behalf of Ricordi, went twice to Buenos Aires; in the meantime he had married Elvira Lazzaroni, by whom he had two children: Roberto (1908-?) and Leopolda (1912–2008). In 1914 Metlicovitz is also one of the designers, together with Armando Vassallo, Luigi Caldanzano and Adolfo De Carolis, involved in the launch of the film Cabiria, a colossal of silent screenplay by Gabriele D'Annunzio, for which he will create four posters. He also designed the trademark that is still used today by Fratelli Branca Distillerie, the producers of Fernet Branca, depicting an eagle with spread wings holding a bottle of the liqueur above a globe.

After ending his collaboration with Casa Ricordi in 1938, he concentrated more and more on painting, preferring landscapes and portraits and participating in the first editions of the Cremona Prize (1939-1940). On October 19, 1943 he died in his house in Ponte Lambro, where he had moved permanently in 1915.

Artistic activity

Posters

Theater and music 
 1898 - Iris, opera by Pietro Mascagni
 1899 - The free colony, opera by Pietro Floridia
 1900 - Anton, opera by Cesare Galeotti
 1900 - Tosca, opera by Giacomo Puccini
 1901 - Lorenza, opera by Edoardo Mascheroni
 1904 - Madama Butterfly, opera by Giacomo Puccini
 1905 - Amica, opera by Pietro Mascagni
 1905 - Giovanni Gallurese, opera by Italo Montemezzi
 1907 - Comic and operetta company directed by Giulio Marchetti
 1907 - Hans the flute player, opera by Louis Ganne
 1908 - The cricket of the hearth, opera by Riccardo Zandonai
 1908 - The dust of Pirlimpinpin, by Costantino Lombardo
 1909 - Manon Lescaut, opera by Giacomo Puccini, edition of Teatro alla Scala
 1910 - Dream of a waltz, by Oscar Straus
 1910 - Italian comic opera company Scognamiglio Caramba
 1911 - Phonotype. The tenor comm. G.Anselmi
 1911 - Conchita, opera of Riccardo Zandonai
 1911 - Quo Vadis...?, opera of J.Nougues
 1912 - Melenis, opera by Riccardo Zandonai
 1913 - Amore in maschera, opera by Yvan de Hartulary Darclée
 1916 - The blue spider, operetta by Alberto Randegger
 1919 - Gianni Schicchi, opera by Giacomo Puccini, Italian premiere
 1919 - Suor Angelica, opera by Giacomo Puccini, Italian premiere
 1919 - Il tabarro, opera by Giacomo Puccini, Italian premiere
 1922 - Romeo and Juliet, opera by Riccardo Zandonai
 1925 - Santa Cruz Company
 1926 - Turandot, opera by Giacomo Puccini
 1926 - Clara Weiss

Cinema 
 1911 - The Divine Comedy "Inferno" - Milano Films
 1913 - Germany - Savoy Film Torino
 1913 - William Tell
 1914 - Cabiria
 1915 - Pagliacci, by Francesco Bertolini
 1915 - Zinga - Itala Film Torino
 1916 - The fire, by Giovanni Pastrone
 1916 - Tigre reale, by Giovanni Pastrone

Others 
 1896 ca. - La Sera
 1897 - Fleurs de Mousse de Sauzé Frères parfumeurs Paris
 1897 - Distillerie Italiane Gas Alcohol Appliances - Milan
 1898 - E. & A. Mele & C. - Umbrellas of every kind - Rich assortments
 1899 - Liebig. Real meat extract
 1904 - Packages for men - Mele & C.- Naples
 1905 ca. - Bitter Shepherd Milan
 1906 - Flouvella de Sauzé Frères parfumeurs Paris
 1908 ca. - Packs and novelties for children maximum cheap. Mele & C. - Naples
 1908 - Superator. Alcohol gas stove
 1909 - Mode novelties. Maximum good market. Apples & C. - Naples
 1909 - Automobile Club di Milan - Inauguration of the new seat
 1909 - L'Ora - Corriere Politico Quotidiano della Sicilia
 1911 - Liane Fleurie Sauzé Frères
 1911 - Mele & C. Massimo buon mercato
 1911 ca. - Os vinhos do Porto de A. Ramos Pinto São uma tentação
 1912 ca. - Sangemini natural mineral water
 1912 ca. - Mavridès' Cigarette Cairo
 1913 - La Rinascente
 1913 - Turin Cirié Lanzo railway line
 1914 - Shoe factory of Varese.Sardi Trolli & C. concessionaires
 1920 - National Insurance Institute
 1920-30 - Sangemini natural mineral water
 1921 - The paradise of the Dolomites Hotel Misurina and Hotel Alpino
 1921 - Waterproofs Ettore Moretti Milan
 1923 - Bottega della gomma Milan
 1925 - Zara
 1925 ca. - Pola Venezia Giulia
 1925 - Company of ferry-boats for England
 1926 - Antigelone Cagnola
 1927 - Milan Fede jams
 1933 - Ettore Moretti Milan waterproof tires
 1933 - Villa Margherita Como Lido
 1937 - Tripoli Lottery
 n.d. - Corriere delle Signore - F. Treves Editori Milan
 n.a. - Chile soda nitrate - nitrogenous fertilizer
 n.a. - Fides Italian Cognac
 n.a. - Chianti Melini
 n.a. - Buitoni milk flour

Events 
 1905 - Exhibition of the Bicycle and Automobile Milan
 1906 - Inauguration of Sempione - International Exhibition - Milan
 1907 - Launching of the royal ship "Roma" at La Spezia
 1911 - International exhibition of industry and work - Turin
 1911 - Varese Horse Fair, April 17-18-19
 1913 - Busseto centenary celebrations 1813-1913, Verdi's centenary
 1914 - Greek Theater of Syracuse - Agamemnon of Aeschylus
 1921 - San Pellegrino Grand Season May–October
 1923 - Teatro Solis Grandes Veglioni Carnaval - Montevideo
 1925 - Erba Incino Equestrian Competition, 10-11-12 October

Pictorial works 
 Portrait of Arrigo Boito, oil on canvas
 Portrait of Giuseppe Verdi, oil on canvas
 Tosca, 6 watercolors for series of postcards
 Madama Butterfly, 12 watercolors for series of postcards
 Germany, 10 watercolors for series of postcards
 Verdi in Sant'Agata, 7 watercolors for series of postcards
 Aida, watercolor for Almanacco Verdiano
 Otello, watercolor for Almanac Verdiano

References

Bibliography 
 Laura Mocci, METLICOVITZ, Leopoldo, in Dizionario biografico degli italiani, LXXIV volume, Roma, Istituto dell'Enciclopedia Italiana, 2010. URL consultato il 12-05-2013.
 Giovanna Ginex, Metlicovitz, Dudovich: grandi cartellonisti triestini: manifesti della Raccolta Achille Bertarelli del Castello Sforzesco di Milano, catalogo mostra, Ginevra-Milano 2001
 G. Mori, Le vacanze degli italiani attraverso i Manifesti Storici della Raccolta Bertarelli, catalogo mostra, Cinisello Balsamo 2004

Other projects 
  Wikiquote contiene citazioni di o su Leopoldo Metlicovitz
  Wikimedia Commons contiene immagini o altri file su Leopoldo Metlicovitz

External links 

 «Sempre avanti!» (1919) - cartolina di propaganda a firma di Metlicovitz, e breve nota biografica.
 *Cenni biografici 

Italian lithographers
Poster artists
Italian illustrators
20th-century Italian painters
1868 births
1944 deaths